Aeromonas taiwanensis is a Gram-negative, oxidase- and catalase-positive, non-spore-forming, motile bacterium of the genus Aeromonas isolated from wounds of patients in Taiwan.

References

External links
Type strain of Aeromonas taiwanensis at BacDive -  the Bacterial Diversity Metadatabase

Aeromonadales
Bacteria described in 2010